Freddie Wall was an American soccer forward who played professionally in the American Soccer League.

In 1924, Wall began his professional career with the Fall River Marksmen of the American Soccer League.  Although he scored two goals in his lone appearance for the Marksmen, he did not return to the ASL until the 1928-1929 season.  That year, he signed with the Newark Skeeters.  Over the next year, he played for seven teams, appearing in only a handful of games before moving.  In 1930, he played for the amateur Newark Portuguese.

External links

References

Sportspeople from Fall River, Massachusetts
Soccer players from Massachusetts
American soccer players
American Soccer League (1921–1933) players
Brooklyn Wanderers players
Boston Soccer Club players
New York Nationals (ASL) players
Newark Skeeters players
Newark Portuguese players
Philadelphia Field Club players
New York Soccer Club players
Association football forwards
Year of birth missing